Dzik, wild boar in Polish, may refer to:
 AMZ Dzik, an armored car
 Jerzy Dzik (born 1950), a Polish paleontologist
 , various Polish Navy ships named Dzik
 , a tugboat operated by the Polish government from 1948 to 1961 or later
 Dzik, a Yucatecan cold meat salad, also known as Salpicón de res

es:ORP Dzik
pl:ORP Dzik